Year 1467 (MCDLXVII) was a common year starting on Thursday (link will display the full calendar) of the Julian calendar.

Events 
 January–December 
 June 15 – Philip the Good is succeeded as Duke of Burgundy, by Charles the Bold.
 October 29 – Battle of Brustem: Charles the Bold defeats the Prince-Bishopric of Liège.
 October 30 or November 11 – Battle of Chapakchur: Uzun Hasan defeats Jahan Shah.
 November 12 – Regent of Sweden Erik Axelsson Tott supports the re-election of deposed Charles VIII of Sweden to the throne.
 December 15 – Battle of Baia: Troops under Stephen III of Moldavia decisively defeat the forces of Matthias Corvinus, King of Hungary, at Baia (present-day Romania). This is the last Hungarian attempt to subdue the Principality of Moldavia.

 Date unknown 
 Third Siege of Krujë: A few months after the failure of the second siege, Mehmed II leads another unsuccessful Ottoman invasion of Albania. 
 The Ōnin War (1467–1477), which initiates the Sengoku period (1467–1615) in Japan, begins.
 While Hassan III of the Maldives is on Hajj, Sayyidh Muhammad deposes his son, acting regent.  On his return, Hassan regains the throne.
 Some papal abbreviators are arrested and tortured on the orders of Pope Paul II, among them Filippo Buonaccorsi.
 King Matthias Corvinus founds the first university in Slovakia, the Universitas Istropolitana in Bratislava.
 The first European polyalphabetic cipher is invented by Leon Battista Alberti (approximate date).
 Juan de Torquemada's book, is published.

Births 
 January – John Colet, English churchman and educational pioneer (d. 1519)
 January 1
 Philip of Cleves, Bishop of Nevers, Amiens, Autun (d. 1505)
 Sigismund I the Old, King of Poland and Grand Duke of Lithuania (d. 1548)
 January 4
 Henry the Younger of Stolberg, Stadtholder of Friesland (1506–1508) (d. 1508)
 Bodo VIII, Count of Stolberg-Wernigerode (1511–1538) (d. 1538)
 January 26 – Guillaume Budé, French scholar (d. 1540)
 February 2 – Columba of Rieti, Italian Dominican tertiary Religious Sister (d. 1501)
 March 19 – Bartolomeo della Rocca, Italian scholar (d. 1504)
 March 21 – Caritas Pirckheimer, German nun (d. 1532)
 May 8 – Adalbert of Saxony, Administrator of Mainz (1482–1484) (d. 1484)
 May 31 – Sibylle of Brandenburg, Duchess of Jülich and Berg (d. 1524)
 August 11 – Mary of York, daughter of King Edward IV of England (d. 1482)
 August 25 – Francisco Fernández de la Cueva, 2nd Duke of Alburquerque, Spanish duke (d. 1526)
 October 21 – Giovanni il Popolano, Italian diplomat (d. 1498)
 November 9
 Charles II, Duke of Guelders, Count of Zutphen from 1492 (d. 1538)
 Philippa of Guelders, twin sister of Charles, Duke of Guelders, Duchess consort of Lorraine (d. 1547)
 November 25 – Thomas Dacre, 2nd Baron Dacre, Knight of Henry VIII of England (d. 1525)
 date unknown
 John Bourchier, 2nd Baron Berners, English translator (d. 1553)
 Krzysztof Szydłowiecki, Polish nobleman (d. 1532)
 John Yonge, English ecclesiastic and diplomatist (d. 1516)
 probable – William Latimer, English churchman and scholar (d. 1545)

Deaths 
 March 13 – Vettore Cappello, Venetian statesman
 March 29 – Matthew Palaiologos Asen,  Byzantine aristocrat and official
 April 20 – Dorotea Gonzaga, Italian noble (b. 1449)
 April 30 – John, Count of Angoulême (b. 1399)
 June 15 – Philip III, Duke of Burgundy (b. 1396)
 September 3 – Eleanor of Portugal, Holy Roman Empress (b. 1434)
 December 12 – Jošt of Rožmberk, Bishop of Breslau, Grand Prior of the Order of St. John (b. 1430)
 December 15 – Jöns Bengtsson Oxenstierna, archbishop and Regent of Sweden (b. 1417)
 date unknown
 Maria of Tver, Grand Princess consort of Muscovy, spouse of Ivan III of Russia (b. 1447)
 Peter III Aaron, prince of Moldavia
 Jahan Shah, leader of Turkmen
 Khan Xälil of Kazan

References